Charles Henry Gordon-Lennox, 6th Duke of Richmond, 6th Duke of Lennox, and 1st Duke of Gordon,  (27 February 181827 September 1903), styled Lord Settrington until 1819 and then Earl of March until 1860, was a British Conservative politician.

Background and education
Born at Richmond House, London, he was the son of Charles Lennox, 5th Duke of Richmond and Lennox and Lady Caroline, daughter of Field Marshal Henry Paget, 1st Marquess of Anglesey. He was educated at Westminster and Christ Church, Oxford, where he had a short career as a cricketer. He served in the Royal Horse Guards and was aide-de-camp to the Duke of Wellington.

Political career
March entered politics as member for Sussex West in 1841. He was sworn of the Privy Council in 1859. In 1860, he succeeded his father as Duke of Richmond and entered the House of Lords. He chaired the Royal Commission on Capital Punishment, which reported in 1866, and the Royal Commission on Water Supply in 1869, which concluded that there was a need for some sort of overall planning of water supplies for domestic use.

He was made a Knight of the Garter in 1867, and filled various positions in government in the Conservative administrations of the Earl of Derby, Disraeli and the marquess of Salisbury. In 1876 he was rewarded for his public service by being created Duke of Gordon and Earl of Kinrara in the peerage of the United Kingdom. He was also Chancellor of the University of Aberdeen from 1861 until his death at Gordon Castle in 1903.

Family

Richmond married Frances Harriett Greville, daughter of Algernon Greville, on 28 November 1843. They had six children:

 Lady Caroline Gordon-Lennox (12 October 18442 November 1934), who acted as chatelaine of Goodwood after her mother's death in 1887. She died unmarried in 1934.
 Charles Gordon-Lennox, 7th Duke of Richmond (1845–1928)
 Lord Algernon Charles Gordon-Lennox (19 September 18473 October 1921), married Blanche Maynard and had issue one daughter, Ivy Gordon-Lennox, (16 June 18873 March 1982), who m. William Cavendish-Bentinck, 7th Duke of Portland.
 Captain Lord Francis Charles Gordon-Lennox (30 July 18491 January 1886), died unmarried
 Lady Florence Gordon-Lennox (21 June 185121 July 1895), died unmarried
 Lord Walter Charles Gordon-Lennox (29 July 186521 October 1922), married Alice Ogilvie-Grant and had issue

Ancestry

Bibliography

References

External links
 
 Gordon Chapel
 CricketArchive: Earl of March

1818 births
1903 deaths
Alumni of Christ Church, Oxford
Chancellors of the University of Aberdeen
Lord Presidents of the Council
206
306
201
Charles
Royal Horse Guards officers
Knights of the Garter
Leaders of the Conservative Party (UK)
Lord-Lieutenants of Banffshire
March, Charles Henry Gordon-Lennox, Earl of
Members of the Privy Council of the United Kingdom
People educated at Westminster School, London
Secretaries for Scotland
English cricketers
Oxford University cricketers
Marylebone Cricket Club cricketers
March, Charles Henry Gordon-Lennox, Earl of
March, Charles Henry Gordon-Lennox, Earl of
March, Charles Henry Gordon-Lennox, Earl of
March, Charles Henry Gordon-Lennox, Earl of
March, Charles Henry Gordon-Lennox, Earl of
Richmond, D6
UK MPs who were granted peerages
English cricketers of 1826 to 1863
Presidents of the Marylebone Cricket Club
Presidents of the Board of Trade
Leaders of the House of Lords
Peers of the United Kingdom created by Queen Victoria
Dukes of Aubigny